This list of Lithuanian-language periodicals includes periodical publications (newspapers, magazines) that were published up to 1904 when the Lithuanian press ban was lifted in Lithuania Proper (then part of the Russian Empire). The periodicals were printed mostly in Lithuania Minor (then part of East Prussia, German Empire) and by the Lithuanian Americans in the United States. Some publications published in Prussia were intended for Prussian Lithuanians, the local Lithuanian-speaking minority. Others were intended for Lithuanians in Russia and were smuggled by Lithuanian book smugglers across the Prussia–Russia border.

Publications
The list is sorted in chronological order. The periodicals that lasted for five years or longer are highlighted with darker background. The publication dates, where known and available, are given in the ISO date format YYYY-MM-DD.

References

Notes

Bibliography

</ref>

Lithuanian-language newspapers
Lithuanian press ban
Lithuanian